Humphrey Dixon is a British film editor.

Humphrey began his career as assistant editor, later becoming a film editor for Merchant Ivory's Autobiography of a Princess (1974). In 1984, he directed Merchant Ivory's documentary The Wandering Company. He was nominated for the BAFTA Award for Best Editing for A Room with a View (1985).

Since the film Sirens (1994), he has collaborated with director John Duigan.

Filmography

Private Peaceful (2012)
Aazaan (2011)
My One and Only (2009)
Wimbledon (2004)
My House in Umbria (2003 TV movie)
Evelyn (2002)
Enemy at the Gates (2001)
Paranoid (2000)
Molly (1999)
Dancing at Lughnasa (1998)
Lawn Dogs (1997)
The Leading Man (1996)
The Proprietor (1996) - Editorial Consultant in London
The Journey of August King (1995)
A Simple Twist of Fate (1994)
Sirens (1994)
The Playboys (1992)
Stepping Out (1991)
Mr. & Mrs. Bridge (1990)
Mister Johnson (1990)
Crusoe (1989)
A Room with a View (1985)
Maria's Lovers (1984)
Heat and Dust (1983)
Quartet (1981)
The Europeans (1979)
Hullabaloo Over Georgie and Bonnie's Pictures (1978 TV movie)
East of Elephant Rock (1977)
Roseland (1977)
Sweet Sounds (1976 documentary short)
The Song Remains the Same (1976)
Autobiography of a Princess (1975)
The Guru (1969) - Assistant Editor

References

External links 
 

Living people
Year of birth missing (living people)
British film editors